Mendo is a Spanish and Portuguese given name and surname. The surnames Méndez and Mendes are derived from Mendo. An alternative Portuguese form of Mendo is Mem.

"Mendo" may refer to:

People
Carlos Mendo (1933–2010), Spanish journalist
Mendo Nunes (11th century), Portuguese nobleman
Mendo Ristovski (born 1956), Australian association football player
 (born 1949), Spanish writer

Other uses
Alternate name for Jumbee, Caribbean folk spirit
Mendó, 2021 album by Alex Cuba